Cornmeal  is a meal (coarse flour) ground from dried corn. It is a common staple food, and is ground to coarse, medium, and fine consistencies, but not as fine as wheat flour can be. In Mexico, very finely ground cornmeal is referred to as corn flour. When fine cornmeal is made from maize that has been soaked in an alkaline solution, e.g., limewater (a process known as nixtamalization), it is called masa harina (or masa flour), which is used for making arepas, tamales and tortillas. Boiled cornmeal is called polenta in Italy and is also a traditional dish and bread substitute in Romania.

Types
There are various types of cornmeal:

Blue cornmeal is light blue or violet in color. It is ground from whole blue corn and has a sweet flavor. The cornmeal consists of dried corn kernels that have been ground into a fine or medium texture.
Steel-ground yellow cornmeal, which is common mostly in the United States, has the husk and germ of the maize kernel almost completely removed. It is conserved for about a year if stored in an airtight container in a cool, dry place.
Stone-ground cornmeal retains some of the hull and germ, lending a little more flavor and nutrition to recipes. It is more perishable, but will store longer if refrigerated. However, it too can have a shelf life of many months if kept in a reasonably cool place.
White cornmeal (mielie-meal), made from white corn, is more common in parts of Africa. It is also popular in the Southern United States for making cornbread.

Regional usage

Caribbean
Cornmeal porridge - a popular meal served for breakfast in Jamaica and Southern Africa. Cornmeal porridge is mentioned in the lyrics of the Bob Marley song No Woman,  No Cry.
Cou-cou - part of the national dish of Barbados, "cou-cou and flying fish".
Funche - a typical breakfast in Puerto Rico cornmeal cooked with coconut milk, milk, raisins, butter, cloves, vanilla, ginger, sugar or honey and topped with fruit and cinnamon. There's also a savory funche made with cornmeal, coconut milk, chicken stock, sofrito and other ingredients. These are usually served with fish.
Funchi also known as fungi/fungee - a cornmeal mush cooked and cooled into a stiff pudding, sometimes eaten with saltfish or pepperpot. It is consumed on the island of Curaçao and is part of the national dish of Antigua and Barbuda.
Mayi moulen - a cornmeal dish in Haiti often cooked with fish or spinach. Can be eaten with avocado.

East Asia
 Tie Bing (貼餅 sticking bread) - This product can either be fluffy like a mantou or more flatbread-like. It is traditionally stuck around the outer rim of a large wok while meat or fish is being cooked. Generally, an alkalizing agent such as baking soda is added to increase the nutrient value. It is also found in northern China.
 Corn congee (棒子麵粥) - A porridge made from plain cornmeal. It is normally thinner than grits or polenta and is often eaten with Chinese pickles.
 Wo tou (窩頭 nest head) - Shaped like a hollow cone, this cornbread looks like a bird's nest, after which it is named. It is commonly eaten in northern China, and may contain dried jujubes and other flavoring agents.

Sub-Saharan Africa

 Tuwo masara - Northern Nigeria
 Mielie-meal or maize meal - Southern Africa
 Nomadi - Democratic Republic of the Congo
 Nshima or bwali - Zambia
 Nsima - Malawi
 Oshifima or Oshimbob - Namibia
 Sadza / Isitshwala/   - Zimbabwe
 Ugali - Great Lakes (sima and posho in Uganda)
 Recipes that may use cornmeal as an additional ingredient are fufu (foufou) in Central and West Africa.

Europe
 Arapash or harapash - Albania (similar to the Romanian style but often combined with lamb organs, or/and goat cheese)
 Farina di granturco - Italy (not the same as farina, which is made from wheat)
 G'omi, mchadi, tchvishtari - Georgia (g'omi is similar to polenta, mchadi - cornbread, tshvishtari - cheese cornbread). Known by different names in local languages ( abysta,  mamrys,  juran-hudar, Nogai: мамырза mamyrza,  dzykka or сера sera), it is also widespread in other Caucasian cuisines.
 Kachamak (качамак) - Bulgaria, North Macedonia and Serbia
 Mălai - Romania (the cornmeal itself; prepared as mămăligă)
 Polenta - southern Europe, especially North Italy
 Banush - Ukraine (the dish prepared from cornmeal with added śmietana, topped with pork rind or mushrooms and bryndza etc. The dish is popular in the Carpathian region of western Ukraine)

Horn of Africa
 Soor - Somalia
Cornmeal is also often used as an additional ingredient in the preparation of injera or lahoh, flatbread that is traditionally eaten in the countries of the Horn of Africa (Djibouti, Eritrea, Ethiopia and Somalia) and nearby Yemen.

East Africa

 Ugali - Kenya, Tanzania
 Posho or kawunga - Uganda
Cornmeal is a staple food in the East Africa region. It is used to make ugali and uji.

Indian Ocean
 Poudine maïs - Mauritius
This is a local dessert dish made from maize flour in which milk, sugar, dried sultanas and cardamon powder are cooked together. The cooked paste is poured on a tray and coconut powder is sprinkled thereon and left to cool. This dessert is often cut into triangular shapes and can be bought from food vendors in the streets of Port Louis and also in market fairs around the island.

South America

 Fubá - Brazil.
 Masarepa - Soaked and cooked corn, ground fine into a flour, used in Colombia and Venezuela to make arepas, almojábanas and empanadas.
 Polenta - a typical dish in many countries, including Argentina, Brazil, Paraguay and Uruguay.

North America

Masa or masa harina - Nixtamalized corn used for making tamales and tortillas in Central America, Mexico, and South America.
 As a batter for a fried food, such as corn dogs
 Made into bread, as in corn fritters, cornbread, hushpuppies, jonnycakes, or spoonbread
 As breading for fried or baked foods, such as fried fish
 As a breakfast cereal ingredient
 Cheese curl-type snack foods, such as Cheetos and Cheezies 
 In corn chips such as Fritos, but not tortilla chips or corn tortillas, which are made from nixtamalized maize flour
Peameal bacon, back bacon rolled in cornmeal, known colloquially in the U.S. as ‘Canadian bacon’
 As a release agent to prevent breads and pizza from sticking to their pans when baking
 As grits
 As a porridge, such as cornmeal mush, which is often then sliced and grilled
 Known as "samp", it was used in colonial times as a kind of porridge.

South Asia
 Makki di roti - a traditional Punjabi bread often eaten with saag in Punjab province of northern India and eastern Pakistan
In parts of northern India and Pakistan ground corn flour is used to make thick slabs of bread which can be eaten with a wide variety of curry dishes or it can be coated in clarified butter or ghee and eaten with yogurt or lassi which is a yogurt based drink especially in summer

See also
 Maize flour
 Semolina
 List of maize dishes

References

External links

Cuisine of the Southern United States
Flour
Maize products